The Office of the Vice President includes personnel who directly support or advise the vice president of the United States. The office is headed by the chief of staff to the vice president of the United States, currently Lorraine Voles. The office also provides staffing and support to the second gentleman of the United States. It is primarily housed in the Eisenhower Executive Office Building (containing the vice president's ceremonial office), with offices for the vice president also in the West Wing, the U.S. Capitol, and in the vice president's official residence.

History
The vice president has three constitutional functions: to replace the president in the event of death, disability or resignation; to count the votes of electors for president and vice president and declare the winners before a joint session of Congress; and to preside over the Senate (with the role of breaking ties). According to Roger Sherman, a Connecticut congressional cabinet member and Founding Father, if the vice-president did not maintain the role of president of the Senate, then another member would have to occupy the neutral position and thus would make the Senate disproportionate.  Vice presidents had few official duties in the executive branch, and were thus considered part of the legislative branch for purposes of salary. Salary for staff of the Office of the Vice President continues to be funded through both legislative and executive branch appropriations.

For the first century and half of its history, the vice president had no staff other than a secretary and a personal assistant or two. This began to change with the 1939 Reorganization Act, which included an "Office of the Vice President" (who at the time was John Nance Garner), under the Executive Office of the President.

Vice President Henry Wallace was given actual executive duties during World War II, as was Alben Barkley, who became a member of the National Security Council in 1949.

The Office of the Vice President has been located in the Eisenhower Executive Office Building since the 1950s. The room in the EEOB was redesigned and included emblems of the Navy Department, coinciding with the office's original purpose, the process was spearheaded by a Boston interior designer, William McPherson. The vice president individually has also been provided an office in the West Wing since 1977. Much of the Office of the Vice President centers around the offices once provided to the secretary of the Navy when the Eisenhower building was first constructed.

Current staff

Office of the Vice President
 Assistant to the President and Chief of Staff to the Vice President: Lorraine Voles
Deputy Chief of Staff to the Vice President: Erin Wilson
Assistant to the Chief of Staff: Yael Belkind
Personal Aide to the Vice President: Opal Vadhan
 Special Assistant to the President and Counsel to the Vice President: Josh Hsu
Deputy Counsel to the Vice President (Detail): Samantha Chaifetz
Associate Counsel to the Vice President: Nasrina Bargzie
Associate Counsel to the Vice President: R. Brandon Rios
Associate Counsel to the Vice President: Sharmistha Das
 Assistant to the President and National Security Advisor to the Vice President: Philip Gordon
 Deputy National Security Advisor to the Vice President: Rebecca Lissner
Executive Secretary and Special Advisor for Defense: James Martin
Special Advisor to the Vice President for National Security and Foreign Policy speechwriter: Dean Lieberman
Special Advisor to the Vice President for Middle East and North Africa: Abram Paley
Special Advisor to the Vice President for East Asia and the Pacific: Nancy Leou
Special Advisor to the Vice President for South Asia: Lisa Sawyer
Special Advisor to the Vice President for Africa: Safia Mohamoud
Special Advisor for Global Economic Issues: Lindsey Zuluaga
Special Advisor for the Western Hemisphere: Joseph Salazar
Special Advisor to the Vice President for Europe and Russia: Alton Buland

 Deputy Assistant to the President & Communications Director for the Vice President: Jamal Simmons
Deputy Communications Director for the Vice President: Rachel Palermo
Deputy Digital Director for the Vice President: Brenna Parker
 Press Secretary for the Vice President: Kirsten Allen
 Deputy Press Secretary: Ernesto Apreza
Director of Press Operations: Tate Mitchell
 Director of Speechwriting: Dave Cavell
Deputy Director of Speechwriting: Steven Kelly
Associate Director of Speechwriting: Alexandra Robinson
 Photographer to the Vice President: Lawrence Jackson 
Director of Video for the Vice President: Hope Hall
 Deputy Assistant to the President and Domestic Policy Advisor to the Vice President: Carmel Martin
Chief Economic Advisor to the Vice President: Deanne Millison
 Policy Advisor to the Vice President: Dr. Ike Irby
Policy Advisor to the Vice President: Michael C. George
Labor Policy Advisor to the Vice President: Dan Pedrotty
Special Assistant to the President and Director of Public Engagement and Intergovernmental Affairs for the Vice President: Megan Jones 
Deputy Assistant to the President and Deputy Director of Public Engagement and Intergovernmental Affairs for the Vice President: Brandon Thompson
Associate Director of Public Engagement and Intergovernmental Affairs for the Vice President: Lillian Sanchez
Deputy Director of Research: Tyler Lykins
Vetting Researcher: Silas Woods III
Director of Scheduling for the Vice President: Marguerite Biagi
Deputy Director of Scheduling for the Vice President: Olivia Hartman
Assistant Scheduler to the Vice President: Thilee Yost
Assistant Scheduler to the Vice President: Danielle Campbell
Director of Advance for the Vice President: Sterling Elmore
Deputy Director of Advance for the Vice President: Juan Ortega 
Director of Legislative Affairs for the Vice President: Grisella Martinez
Associate Director of Legislative Affairs for the Vice President: Brittany Carmon
Legislative Assistant: Halle Ewing
Staff Secretary, Office of the Vice President: Rebecca Cooper
Associate Director/ Staff Secretary, Office of the Vice President: Maria Restrepo
Associate Director/ Staff Secretary, Office of the Vice President: Saige Wenik
 Director of Management and Administration for the Office of the Vice President: Cynthia Bernstein
Director of West Wing Operations to the Vice President: Adam Topper
Deputy Director of Operations for the Vice President: Michael deForest
Social Secretary & Residence Manager to the Vice President: Storm Horncastle
Deputy Social Secretary: Amanda Trocola

Office of the Second Gentleman
 Deputy Assistant to the President and Chief of Staff to the Second Gentleman: Jordan Brooks
Director of Public Engagement and Policy to the Second Gentleman: Zaina Javaid
Deputy Director for Scheduling to the Second Gentleman: Elizabeth Ivey Purcell
Deputy Assistant to the President and Communications Director to the Second Gentleman: Katie Peters
Communications Assistant, Office of the Second Gentleman: Darcy Palder 
Associate Director of Projects and Special Assistant to the Second Gentleman: Mitchell Rosenberg

See also
 Title 32 of the Code of Federal Regulations

References

Executive Office of the President of the United States
United States Senate
Vice presidency of the United States